This is a list of notable rheologists.

Rheologists 

 Eugene C. Bingham
 Robert Byron Bird
 Mosto Bousmina
 Percy Williams Bridgman
 Pierre Carreau
 Alfred L. Copley
 Maurice Couette
 Armand de Waele
 Jerald Ericksen
 Denis Evans
 Henry Eyring
 Gerald Fuller
 Eugene Guth
 John Hinch
 Isydore Hlynka
 Jacob Israelachvili
 L. Gary Leal
 Frank Matthews Leslie
 Arthur S. Lodge
 Christopher Macosko
 Raghunath Anant Mashelkar
 Josef Meixner
 Baltasar Mena Iniesta
 Arthur B. Metzner
 Melvin Mooney
 James G. Oldroyd
 Egon Orowan
 Anton Peterlin
 Jeshwanth Rameshwaram
 Markus Reiner
 Jack Richardson
 Ronald Rivlin
 G. W. Scott Blair
 Zinovii Shulman
 Clifford Truesdell
 Manfred Wagner
 Dieter Weichert
 Karl Weissenberg
 James L. White
 Clarence Zener

See also 
 Lists of people by occupation

Lists of physicists by field